Ad and Lib was a Canadian television series which aired on CBC Television in 1954.

Premise
General store operators Ad (Joe Austin) and Lib (Larry D. Mann) are located in a somewhat rural setting. Their improvised dialogue discusses the difference between urban and rural lifestyles.

Production and scheduling
Leo Orenstein produced Ad and Lib.

The series aired weekdays at 6:30 p.m. (Eastern). After little more than three months, CBC cancelled the programme without warning.

Critical reception
Ottawa Citizen television critic Bob Blackburn described the series as CBC's "second biggest turkey" of 1954, behind Clarke, Campbell & Co..

References

External links
 
 

CBC Television original programming
1954 Canadian television series debuts
1954 Canadian television series endings
Black-and-white Canadian television shows